Observatory Circle is a neighborhood in Northwest Washington, D.C., dominated by the circle of the same name — the grounds of the United States Naval Observatory and the official residence of the U.S. vice president.

The neighborhood is bounded on the northeast by Massachusetts Avenue; on the south by Calvert Street, the Observatory Circle property, and Whitehaven Street; and on the west by 37th Street.

The major thoroughfare of the neighborhood is Massachusetts Avenue, which in the area of Observatory Circle is mostly lined with embassies. Therefore, most of the area is commonly regarded as Embassy Row.

Neighborhoods in Northwest (Washington, D.C.)